Andrea Veroli (died 1478) was a Roman Catholic prelate who served as Bishop of Camerino (1464–1478),
Bishop of Muro Lucano (1463–1464),
Bishop of Urbino (1452–1463),
Bishop of Boiano (1439–1452),
and Bishop of Conversano (1437–1439).

Biography
On 29 April 1437, Andrea Veroli was appointed during the papacy of Pope Eugene IV as Bishop of Conversano.
On 25 September 1439, he was appointed during the papacy of Pope Eugene IV as Bishop of Boiano.
On 11 September 1452, he was appointed during the papacy of Pope Nicholas V as Bishop of Urbino.
On 26 May 1463, he was appointed during the papacy of Pope Pius II as Bishop of Muro Lucano.
On 8 October 1464, he was appointed during the papacy of Pope Paul II as Bishop of Camerino. 
He served as Bishop of Camerino until his death in 1478.

While bishop, he was the principal co-consecrator of Thomas Scrope, Auxiliary Bishop of Norwich (1450); and Johann Goldener, Auxiliary Bishop of Bamberg (1451).

References

External links and additional sources
 (for Chronology of Bishops) 
 (for Chronology of Bishops) 
 (for Chronology of Bishops) 
 (for Chronology of Bishops) 
 (for Chronology of Bishops) 
 (for Chronology of Bishops) 
 (for Chronology of Bishops) 
 (for Chronology of Bishops) 
 (for Chronology of Bishops) 
 (for Chronology of Bishops)

Books

15th-century Italian Roman Catholic bishops
Bishops appointed by Pope Eugene IV
Bishops appointed by Pope Nicholas V
Bishops appointed by Pope Pius II
Bishops appointed by Pope Paul II
1478 deaths